The 2002 Norwegian Football Cup was the 97th edition of the Norwegian Football Cup. Vålerenga won their 3rd Norwegian Championship title after defeating Odd Grenland in the final with the score 1–0. The final was played on Sunday 3 November at Ullevaal Stadion in Oslo.

Odd Grenland got to the final by beating Åssiden, Lyngdal, Bærum, Start, Strømsgodset and Stabæk.

Vålerenga reached the final by beating Vang, Eidsvold Turn, Lørenskog, Moss, Viking and Aalesund.

Calendar
Below are the dates for each round as given by the official schedule:

First round

The 49 winners from the Second Qualifying Round joined with 79 clubs from the Tippeligaen, First Division and Second Division in this round of the competition. These matches took place on 23, 28, 29 and 30 May 2002.

|colspan="3" style="background-color:#97DEFF"|23 May 2002

|-
|colspan="3" style="background-color:#97DEFF"|28 May 2002

|-
|colspan="3" style="background-color:#97DEFF"|29 May 2002

|-
|colspan="3" style="background-color:#97DEFF"|30 May 2002

|}

Second round
The 64 winners from the First Round took part in this stage of the competition. These matches took place on 12, 13 and 19 June 2002.

|colspan="3" style="background-color:#97DEFF"|12 June 2002

|-
|colspan="3" style="background-color:#97DEFF"|13 June 2002

|-
|colspan="3" style="background-color:#97DEFF"|19 June 2002

|}

Third round
The 32 winners from the Second Round took part in this stage of the competition. These matches took place on 26 and 27 June 2002.

|colspan="3" style="background-color:#97DEFF"|26 June 2002

|-
|colspan="3" style="background-color:#97DEFF"|27 June 2002

|}

Fourth round
The 16 winners from the Third Round took part in this stage of the competition. These matches took place on 7 and 8 August 2002.

|colspan="3" style="background-color:#97DEFF"|7 August 2002

|-
|colspan="3" style="background-color:#97DEFF"|8 August 2002

|}

Quarter-finals

Semi-finals

Final

References

External links 
 
Cup Website

Norwegian Football Cup seasons
Norwegian Football Cup
Football Cup